Ain Smara is a municipality in Constantine, Algeria. Its original name is Aïn Smara.

Geography 
It is bordered by Constantine province and Ali Mendjeli (east), Oued el ethmania (Mila) (west), Ibn Ziad (north) and El Khroub (south). The Hricha Amar quarter of Ain Smara is one of the biggest Constantine quarters.

Demographics 
Ain Smara has a population of about 32,548 people (2008) with 175 km² land area.

History 
Ain Smara was founded in 1854. Its popularity was due to the existence of the Chettaba mountains. During the Ottoman era (1515-1830) it was close to Turc baylek Constantine. It was colonized by the French from 1830–1962 and remained a quarter of Oued el ethmania until the administrative division of 1984 when Ain Smara became a municipality.

Sport
Football is the most popular sport. The two main football clubs are Ittihad Riyadi Beladiat Aïn Smara (IRBAS) and Mouloudia Beladiat Aïn Smara (MBAS). They play in sand stadiums.

Several other sports use Bachiri Mokhtar complex, including judo, karate, handball and volleyball.

Education
There are five primary schools;
Ali Boukerzaza
Amar Bourgoud
Amar Belkerfa
Hricha Amar 1
Hricha Amar 2

Its three secondary schools are:
Mustafa Kateb technicom
Mohamed Nadjar
Chmachma Ali

Mosques
Five mosques are present:
Okba Bin Nafaa - Amar Bin Yasser
Mussa Ibn Nussair - Essalam
El farouk

References

External links 
http://ency-education.com/ain-smara.html
https://web.archive.org/web/20110728114439/http://eulerdz.toile-libre.org/lycee_ain_smara.php

Communes of Constantine Province